KUSH 1600 AM is a radio station licensed to Cushing, Oklahoma. The station broadcasts a Full service format, consisting of local and national talk, sports, and a music format consisting of Americana, country, Texas, and local Oklahoma music with a progressive element in overnights.  KUSH is owned by Richard Sellers, through licensee Oil Patch Radio, Inc. As of 2022, Molly Payne is the general manager. With the station since 1998, Hugh Foley is the program director, music director, sports director, and producer of Native Air.

Translators

References

External links
KUSH's website

USH
Radio stations established in 1953